Sir Robert Barr, 1st Baronet of Glasgow, Lanarkshire died c.1629 having been made a baronet of Nova Scotia 29 September 1628. On his death the baronetcy became dormant.

References

Baronets in the Baronetage of Nova Scotia
1629 deaths
17th-century Scottish people
17th-century Canadian people
Year of birth missing